Antoine Jesel (born 16 October 1981) is a French adaptive rower of Nigerien descent. He has competed at the Paralympic Games three times and has won one Paralympic bronze medal, he has also won three medals at the World Rowing Championships and two medals at the European Rowing Championships in both mixed coxed four and double sculls.

References

External links
 
 

1981 births
Living people
French people of Nigerien descent
Paralympic rowers of France
French male rowers
Rowers at the 2012 Summer Paralympics
Rowers at the 2016 Summer Paralympics
Rowers at the 2020 Summer Paralympics
Medalists at the 2020 Summer Paralympics
World Rowing Championships medalists for France
Paralympic bronze medalists for France